Ramil Gaisin (born 26 July 1991) is a Russian rugby union player who generally plays as a fly half represents Russia internationally.

He was included in the Russian squad for the 2019 Rugby World Cup which is scheduled to be held in Japan for the first time and also marks his first World Cup appearance.

Career 
He made his international debut for Russia against Canada on 17 November 2012.

Honours
 Russian Championships (8): 2012, 2014, 2016, 2017, 2018, 2019, 2020-21, 2021-22
 Russian Cup (6): 2014, 2016, 2017, 2020, 2021, 2022
 Russian Supercup (3): 2014, 2015, 2017
 Nikolaev Cup (4): 2017, 2018, 2021, 2022
 European Rugby Continental Shield (2): 2016-17, 2017-18

References 

Russian rugby union players
Russia international rugby union players
Living people
1991 births
Rugby union fly-halves
Russian people of Uzbek descent
Sportspeople from Krasnoyarsk
Yenisey-STM Krasnoyarsk players